Parquet Courts is an American rock band from New York City. The band consists of Andrew Savage (vocals, guitar), Austin Brown (vocals, guitar, keyboard), Sean Yeaton (bass, vocals), and Max Savage (drums).

History
Band members Andrew Savage and Austin Brown met in Denton, Texas while both students at the University of North Texas, in a student club named Knights of the Round Turntable, where they listened to and shared new records. Andrew had a number of musical projects during college, including Teenage Cool Kids and Fergus & Geronimo. Andrew and brother Max Savage, Parquet Courts' drummer, were both born and raised in Denton. The three relocated to Brooklyn after college and soon started Parquet Courts.

The band released their debut album, American Specialties, as an independent, limited cassette release in 2011. The album was later reissued with Rough Trade Records in 2021.

The band's second studio album, Light Up Gold (2012), was initially released on Savage's Dull Tools label and later reissued on What's Your Rupture? in 2013.  Light Up Gold received widespread critical acclaim in both the DIY underground and mainstream rock press.

In 2014, the band reached #55 on the Billboard album chart with its third studio album, Sunbathing Animal.

Later in 2014, the band released "Uncast Shadow of a Southern Myth" as a single under an alternative name, Parkay Quarts. Soon afterward they released their fourth studio album, Content Nausea, on which Sean and Max were absent due to other commitments.

The following year the band released a collaboration LP Ramsgate with PC Worship under the name PCPC. They also released a mostly instrumental, experimental EP, entitled Monastic Living.

On February 4, 2016, the band announced their fifth studio album, entitled Human Performance. The album was released on April 8 through Rough Trade. Co-frontman and the artist of the album's packaging and art, Andrew Savage, received a Grammy Awards nomination for his work.

On October 13, 2017, Andrew Savage, released his first solo album, Thawing Dawn, through Dull Tools under the stage name A. Savage.

That same month the band released Milano, a collaboration album with Daniele Luppi featuring  Yeah Yeah Yeahs lead singer Karen O.

On May 18, 2018, the band released their sixth LP, Wide Awake! It was named "album of the year"  by Australian radio station Double J. Their song, "Almost Had to Start a Fight/In and Out of Patience", is featured in the video game EA Sports NHL 19, "One Man No City" is featured in an Episode of The Blacklist, "Wide Awake" appeared as soundtrack in Konami football game, eFootball Pro Evolution Soccer 2020.

The band's seventh full-length album, Sympathy for Life, was released on October 22, 2021.

Between February and March 2022, Parquet Courts headlined a North American tour, with Nigerien afro-psychedelic guitarist Mdou Moctar as their opening act.

Musical style
Their musical style has been described as indie rock, post-punk, art punk, and garage punk.

Band members
 Andrew Savage – lead and backing vocals, lead and rhythm guitar, keyboards
 Austin Brown – lead and backing vocals, lead and rhythm guitar, keyboards
 Sean Yeaton – bass guitar, backing and occasional lead vocals
 Max Savage – drums, percussion, backing vocals

Discography

Albums

Studio albums

Collaborative albums

Live albums
Live at Third Man Records (2015)

EPs
Tally All the Things That You Broke (2013) (as Parkay Quarts) #15 US Heat
Monastic Living (2015)

Singles

Other
Ramsgate, PCPC (2015) (collaboration with PC Worship)

Notes

References

External links
Official website
A. Savage

American post-punk music groups
Indie rock musical groups from New York (state)
Musical groups from Brooklyn
Musical groups established in 2010
Rough Trade Records artists
Third Man Records artists
2010 establishments in New York City
Mom + Pop Music artists
Columbia Records artists
What's Your Rupture? artists
Garage rock groups from New York (state)